The Störtebeker Festival is an yearly open-air theatre festival in Germany. It is based on stories around the medieval German privateer Klaus Störtebeker and his Victual Brothers, who later turned to pirates.

Founded in 1959 as part of an East German cultural initiative, the festival has become Germany's most successful open-air theatre event, and is broadcast by public television network NDR. It is held in the small town of Ralswiek on the isle of Rügen.

Background 
In 1959, the "Rügenfestspiele" were founded in Ralswiek as part of a cultural commission of the GDR and the Ralswiek natural stage was created. The place for the then Rügen Festival was found in the spring of 1959 between Ralswiek Castle and the Boddenufer, and the natural stage was then built in five months of construction and the village was converted into a festival venue.

From 1959 to 1961 and 1980 to 1981 the Dramatic Ballad "Klaus Störtebeker" by Kurt Barthel was performed under the direction of Hanns Anselm Perten and the choral direction of Günther Wolf with about 1,000 participants. A total of 670,000 visitors were counted during these five summers.

Production since 1993

Content 
In contrast to the piece of the time, the legend of the pirate Klaus Störtebeker, who sailed the Baltic Sea with his Vitalien brothers at the end of the 14th century, is told at the Störtebeker Festival since 1993, each spread over a period of four to six years. In 2006 the production was called In Henker's Hand, in which Klaus Störtebeker was beheaded. The fourth cycle is planned for the period 2007-2012; the first episode in the summer of 2007 was titled Betrayed and Sold. In 2009, a trilogy began about the treasure of Störtebeker. The cycle was completed by the piece Störtebeker's Death. In 2013 we started from scratch with the beginning of a legend. Sascha Gluth, who took over the role of Klaus Störtebeker from 2002 to 2012, was replaced by Bastian Semm. The role of Goedeke Michels was taken over by Andreas Euler. Both played their leading roles for a cycle long (2013-2017).

Number of Visitors 
On August 17, 2007, the 912th performance since 1993 counted the four millionth visitor.

On September 1, 2008, the 2005 season record was broken. On this day, the 367,000th visitor was counted, six performances before the end of the season. However, this record was broken again in 2009, with a total of 394,766 spectators attending the most successful open-air theatre in Germany this year.

On July 19, 2010, the 1091st performance since 1993 counted the five millionth visitor to Ralswiek. This results in an average of 4600 visitors per performance with a capacity of 8802 seats.

With the end of the 2016 season, the festival will attract more than 7.3 million visitors in 24 years and more than 1500 performances.

Contributors 

The Störtebeker Festival employs more than 140 extras, 20 actors, 30 horses, four ships with skippers, and other behind-the-scenes staff. The casting of the extras takes place at the beginning of March of the respective year.

Actors with the Most Contributions

Overview of performers

Performances since 1993

Economic Situation 

The number of visitors to the spectacle has increased significantly since 1993. In 2006, there was a small decrease in the number of visitors, which was also in line with the general trend in tourism figures on the island of Rügen and was due to the bad weather and the economic situation in Germany. In 2007, however, there was another increase and the 2008 season began with a significant increase in viewers.

Störtebeker Festspiele GmbH & Co. KG is a private family business that does not receive government subsidies and is co-financed by sponsors. The new media partner has been the NDR's.

Peter Hick has been theatre director of the Störtebeker Festspiele since 1993. His wife Ruth Hick and daughter Anna-Theresa Hick are managing directors of the company.

References

External links

Official website of the Störtebeker Festival, 

Theatre festivals in Germany
Rügen
Events in Mecklenburg-Western Pomerania
Culture of Mecklenburg-Western Pomerania
1959 establishments in East Germany
Recurring events established in 1959
Annual events in Germany